The Homeland War Memorial is a Croatian state medal awarded to both Croatian and foreign citizens who participated in the nation's Croatian War of Independence as a volunteer, part of the Croatian Army and Croatian Council of Defence or in some other role.

The medal was widely granted, given to over 430,000 people who participated in the war in some form. Much less number has been given in its first and original form Spomenica Domovinskog rata 1990.-1992. to those who participated in the resistance and early days of the formation of the Croatian state and army in the period 1990-1992, and as such was established on the 9th of June 1992.

Notable recipients 
 Imra Agotic
 Mate Boban
 Radimir Čačić
 Zvonimir Cervenko
 Frane Vinko Golem
 Josip Jovic
 Ante Kotromanovic
 Alfred Freddy Krupa
 Slobodan Lang
 Sveto Letica
 Josip Lucic
 Predrag Matić
 Rudolf Perešin
 Željko Reiner
 Daniel Srb
 Predrag Stipanović
 Petar Stipetić  -  (Chief of the General Staff of the Armed Forces of the Republic of Croatia)
 Franjo Tuđman  -  (as the President of Croatia, presented to him by Nedjeljko Mihanović, the President of Sabor)

References

External links 
 

Croatian War of Independence
Orders, decorations, and medals of Croatia
Awards established in 1995
1995 establishments in Croatia
Campaign medals